Marinibacterium is a Gram-negative genus of bacteria from the family of Rhodobacteraceae with one known species (Marinibacterium profundimaris). Marinibacterium profundimaris has been isolated from deep seawater from the Atlantic Ocean.

References

Rhodobacteraceae
Bacteria genera
Monotypic bacteria genera